The Mælefjell Tunnel is a  road tunnel connecting Århus in Seljord and Gvammen in Hjartdal in Vestfold og Telemark, Norway. The tunnel was opened on 19 December 2019, as Norway's seventh longest road tunnel. It became a part of the European route E134, and made the route about 10 km shorter. Trucks will save about 18 minutes of driving. Construction started in 2013, and the breakthrough occurred on 3 May 2017.

References

External links 
 "E134 Gvammen-Århus" - Official Statens Vegvesen road project site
 "Mælefjell tunnel, Telemark" - Official NCC tunnel project site

Road tunnels in Vestfold og Telemark
2019 establishments in Norway
Tunnels completed in 2019
European routes in Norway
Seljord
Hjartdal